Gudrun Gärtner (born 24 December 1958) is a German volleyball player. She competed in the women's tournament at the 1976 Summer Olympics.

References

External links
 

1958 births
Living people
German women's volleyball players
Olympic volleyball players of East Germany
Volleyball players at the 1976 Summer Olympics
People from Ludwigslust
Sportspeople from Mecklenburg-Western Pomerania